The grey-backed thrush (Turdus hortulorum) is a species of bird in the family Turdidae. It breeds in northeastern China and the Russian Far East and winters in southern China and northern Vietnam. Its natural habitat is temperate forests. A captive bred pair laid five eggs, which hatched 14 days after the first egg was laid. The young left the nest 12 days later.

References

grey-backed thrush
Birds of Manchuria
grey-backed thrush
grey-backed thrush
Taxonomy articles created by Polbot